Willi Kronhardt (born 17 February 1969 in Tokarevka, Kazakh SSR, Soviet Union) is a German football manager and former player.

Kronhardt made 68 appearances in the 2. Bundesliga during his playing career. He moved to (West) Germany aged 8 and has lived there ever since.

References

External links 
 

1969 births
Living people
People from Karaganda Region
Russian and Soviet-German people
German footballers
Association football defenders
2. Bundesliga players
TSV Havelse players
SC Fortuna Köln players
Eintracht Braunschweig players
FC Energie Cottbus players
1. FC Lokomotive Leipzig players
Tennis Borussia Berlin players
SV Arminia Hannover players
German football managers
2. Bundesliga managers
Eintracht Braunschweig managers
Eintracht Braunschweig non-playing staff
Alemannia Aachen managers
1. FC Lokomotive Leipzig managers
SV Elversberg managers
Soviet emigrants to West Germany
Kazakhstani footballers
Soviet footballers
German expatriate football managers
Expatriate football managers in Sudan
German expatriate sportspeople in Sudan
Al-Merrikh SC managers